The Jardim do Ouro Dam is a proposed hydroelectric dam on the Jamanxim River in the state of Pará, Brazil.
It has not been studied on detail due to relatively low return on investment compared to other projects in the region.

Location

The Jardim do Ouro Dam is proposed to be built on the Jamanxim River in the state of Pará, in the Tapajós river basin.
It would be built in the municipality of Itaituba.

The hydroelectric power plant will be part of the proposed  Tapajos hydroelectric complex on the Tapajós and Jamanxim rivers.
Others are the São Luiz do Tapajós (6,133 MW), Jatobá (2,338 MW), Cachoeira do Cai (802 MW), Cachoeira dos Patos (528 MW) and Jamanxim (881 MW), all under study, as well as the Chacorão (3,336 MW).

Technical

The plant would deliver .
A "platform" approach is proposed for construction to minimise environmental impact.
There would be no access roads, and workers would be taken to the site by helicopter.
After construction is complete the site would be regenerated.
Detailed feasibility studies were delayed since the dam, in the upper part of the river, would have higher costs than other projects in the region.

Notes

Sources

Hydroelectric power stations in Brazil
Dams in Pará
Jardim do Ouro Dam
Proposed renewable energy power stations in Brazil